First Love is an American soap opera which ran on NBC Daytime from July 5, 1954 to December 30, 1955. The series aired at 4:15 p.m. EST, between Golden Windows and Concerning Miss Marlowe. Although the show had a strong fan following, at the time NBC had little use for developing any of their daytime shows (the first successful NBC daytime soap was not until 1963's The Doctors) and canceled First Love after a year and a half. Many cast members such as Patricia Barry, Val Dufour and Rosemary Prinz went on to become long-running daytime stars.

Created by Adrian Samish and written by Myrna Starr, the series centered on jet engineer Zach James (Val Dufour, then Tod Andrews) and his difficult marriage to Laurie James (née Kennedy) (Patricia Barry). Due to being neglected as a child, Zach was obsessed with building a name for himself. Laurie tried to understand him but was unable to help him deal with his problems, as he went on trial for the murder of a woman aviator he may have been having an affair with.

The show became known chiefly for a major blooper early in its run. A Friday cliffhanger involved Zach (Dufour) seeing his friend Chris (Frankie Thomas) crash his plane. Zach ran to tell Chris' wife Amy (Prinz), "Chris cracked up the plane." In his rush, Dufour blurted out, "Chris crapped", then abruptly added, "...on the plane." Patricia Barry began to giggle. When the camera cut to a "bereaved" Prinz, she was shaking with laughter. Supposedly NBC nearly fired all three actors, but changed their minds after fans wrote in praising them for the scene. In 2003 Prinz denied such a scene ever made it to the air.

Cast

Zach James - Val Dufour, then Tod Andrews
Laurie James - Patricia Barry
Matthew James - Paul McGrath
Amy - Rosemary Prinz
Chris - Frankie Thomas
Paul Kennedy - Melville Ruick
Doris Kennedy - Peggy Allenby
Judge Kennedy - Howard Smith
Mike Kennedy - John Dutra
Bruce McKee - Jay Barney
Quentin Andrews - Frederic Downs
Peggy Gordon - Henrietta Moore
Phil Gordon - Joe Warren

References

External links
IMDB profile

NBC original programming
American television soap operas
1954 American television series debuts
1955 American television series endings
Black-and-white American television shows
English-language television shows